Like all municipalities of Puerto Rico, Hormigueros is subdivided into administrative units called barrios, which are roughly comparable to minor civil divisions, (and means wards or boroughs or neighborhoods in English). The barrios and subbarrios, in turn, are further subdivided into smaller local populated place areas/units called sectores (sectors in English). The types of sectores may vary, from normally sector to urbanización to reparto to barriada to residencial, among others. Some sectors appear in two barrios.

List of sectors by barrio

Benavente
Sector Eureka

Guanajibo
Calle La Ceiba
Camino Cachito
Camino Fian Toro
Camino Justo Colón
Camino Los Barbosa
Carretera 343 (until km 2.3)
Égida Presbiteriana del Ángel
Hogar Eterno Paraíso de Amor
Hogar San José
Parcelas San Romualdo
Reparto Santa Ana
Sector Higinia Vázquez
Sector Hoya Grande
Sector Las Plumas
Sector Los Quiles
Sector Los Santana
Sector Punto Cubano
Urbanización Buenaventura
Urbanización Paseo Loma Linda
Urbanización Monte Bello
Urbanización Valle Hermoso
Urbanización Villa Zoraida

Hormigueros

Apartamentos Balcones de Casa Blanca
Calle Gandules
Carretera 346 (km 2.0)
Condominio Monserrate Eldely Apartments
Hormigueros Apartments
Reparto Las Delicias
Sector Cuqui Cabrera
Sector Monte Cristo
Urbanización Colinas del Oeste
Urbanización Estancias del Río
Urbanización Jardines San Francisco
Urbanización La Monserrate
Urbanización Mansiones La Monserrate
Urbanización Verdún
Urbanización Verdún II

Hormigueros barrio-pueblo
Apartamentos Monserrate Court
Camino Waldemar Rivera
Residencial Gabriel Soler
Sector Los Barros

Jagüitas
Camino Francisco Cruz
Camino Julio Minguela
Reparto Vista Hermosa
Sector Bracero (from km 2.4 of Carretera 344 onwards)
Sector Cuchilla
Sector El Caracol
Sector Fondo del Saco
Sector Los Ayala
Sector Plan Bonito
Sector Quintana
Urbanización Paseo Los Peregrinos

Lavadero
Camino Guarema
Camino Los Espolas
Haciendas Constancia
Reparto Brisas de Lavadero
Reparto Loma Linda
Reparto San Gabriel
Sector Campo Alegre
Sector Coloso Medina
Sector El Hoyo
Sector La Loma
Urbanización Jardines de la Casona
Urbanización Paseo La Ceiba
Urbanización San José
Urbanización Villas de Lavadero

See also

 List of communities in Puerto Rico

References

Hormigueros
Hormigueros